Pjetër or Peter Spani may refer to:

Peter Spani (League of Lezhë), nobleman of northern Albania
Pjetër Spani (bishop), Bishop of Bar, of the Spani family